Sir David Sanders Davies  (11 May 1852 – 28 February 1934) was a Welsh businessman, merchant and Liberal Party politician.

Family and education
David Sanders Davies was the son of John Owen Davies   He was educated  at Llandovery College   In 1886,he married  Jane Emily Gee and they made their home at Dolgelly in Merionethshire. They had one daughter  who married Lt-Col J E Lewis DSO.

Career
Davies went into the textile business. By the end of the First World War he was described as a successful Manchester merchant. He became Governing Director of Pugh, Davies & Co. Ltd, Manchester   wholesale milliners, warehousemen  and textile merchants. Davies clearly acquired great wealth through his business interests. In 1913 he presented  of land near Denbigh, worth £5000, to the Welsh National Memorial Association for the building of a sanatorium for people suffering from Tuberculosis. He served for a while as the Treasurer of the Welsh National Memorial Association.

Politics

Local government
Davies involved himself in local government affairs. He took a leading part in county council and educational work in Denbighshire. He was High Sheriff of Denbighshire in 1915. He was Chairman of the Denbighshire County Appeal Tribunal and Pensions Committee   and also served as a Justice of the Peace.

Parliament
Davies was selected to fight the Denbigh Division of Denbighshire at the 1918 general election as a Coalition Liberal. He had no Unionist opponent, so was presumably awarded the Coalition coupon.  He won the seat easily in a straight fight with Labour, gaining 83% of the poll.

Davies did not contest Denbigh again, intimating as early as the autumn of 1921 that he wished to stand down at the next election (by which time he would be 70 years old). It was reported at that time that his likely successor as Coalition Liberal candidate would be Alderman Walter Gummow Dodd, the Chairman of the Denbighshire Education Committee. Dodd was not selected however but the seat was won by another member of the Denbighshire Education establishment, John Cledwyn Davies, for the Lloyd George National Liberals.

Honours
Davies was knighted in the 1918 New Years Honours List.

References

External links 

1852 births
1934 deaths
People educated at Llandovery College
Liberal Party (UK) MPs for Welsh constituencies
UK MPs 1918–1922
Welsh industrialists
Knights Bachelor
High Sheriffs of Denbighshire
Welsh justices of the peace